Dominic Thiem was the defending champion, having won the previous tournament in 2013, but concentrating on the ATP tour he did not participate this year.

Lamine Ouahab won the title, defeating Javier Martí in the final.

Seeds

Draw

Finals

Top half

Bottom half

References
 Main Draw
 Qualifying Draw

Morocco Tennis Tour - Casablanca - Singles
2015 Morocco Tennis Tour
Morocco Tennis Tour – Casablanca